United Nations Security Council Resolution 5, adopted on May 8, 1946, deferred decisions on Soviet troops in Iran until the Iranian government had time to confer with the Soviet Union and submit a report to the UN regarding all information about Soviet troops in their country.

The resolution was adopted with 10 votes, while the USSR was absent.

See also
Anglo-Soviet invasion of Iran
Azerbaijan People's Government
List of United Nations Security Council Resolutions 1 to 100 (1946–1953)
Republic of Mahabad
United Nations Security Council Resolution 3

References
Text of the Resolution at undocs.org

External links
 

 0005
1946 in Iran
1946 in the Soviet Union 
Iran–Soviet Union border
Iran–Soviet Union relations
 0005
 0005
May 1946 events